Gutsche is a German surname. Notable people with this surname include:

 C. David Gutsche (1921–2018), American chemist
 Clara Gutsche (born 1949), American-born Canadian photographer
 Gail Gutsche, American activist and politician
 Thelma Gutsche (1915–1984), South African filmmaker
 Torsten Gutsche (born 1968), East German-German sprint canoer